Genes & Development is a peer-reviewed scientific journal covering molecular biology, molecular genetics, cell biology, and development. It was established in 1987 and is published twice monthly by Cold Spring Harbor Laboratory Press in association with The Genetics Society.

According to the Journal Citation Reports, the journal has a 2012 impact factor of 12.44, ranking it 14th out of 181 journals in the category "Cell Biology", third out of 40 journals in the category "Developmental Biology", and 7th out of 158 journals in the category "Genetics & Heredity". Over 1999–2004, the journal was ranked fifth in the "Molecular Biology and Genetics" category according to ScienceWatch, with an average of 47 citations per paper. All issues are available online via the journal website as PDFs, with a text version additionally available from August 1997. Content over 6 months old is freely available.

Since 1989, the editor-in-chief has been Terri Grodzicker (Cold Spring Harbor Laboratory).

References

External links
 

Developmental biology journals
Delayed open access journals
Genetics journals
Publications established in 1987
Cold Spring Harbor Laboratory Press academic journals
Biweekly journals
English-language journals
Academic journals associated with learned and professional societies
Genetics in the United Kingdom